Tomáš Trucha (born 17 October 1971) is a Czech football. Besides Czech Republic, he has managed in South Africa, Kenya, Botswana, and Malaysia.

Career

In 2013, Trucha managed Czech third division side Valašské Meziříčí. After that, he worked as youth coach at FC Cape Town in South Africa.

In 2016, he was appointed assistant manager of Viktoria Plzeň, one of the Czech Republic's most successful clubs.

In 2018, Trucha was appointed manager of  Orapa United in Botswana.

In 2019, he was appointed manager of Township Rollers, Botswana's most successful team.

In 2020, he was appointed manager of AFC Leopards in Kenya, but left after a month due to receiving physical threats from people claiming to be members of AFC Leopards.

Before the 2021 season, Trucha was appointed manager of Malaysian outfit Penang.

Managerial statistics

References

External links
 Tomáš Trucha at playmakerstats.com

Czech football managers
Czech expatriate sportspeople in Malaysia
Penang F.C. managers
Malaysia Super League managers
Expatriate football managers in Kenya
Expatriate football managers in Botswana
Living people
1971 births
Expatriate football managers in Malaysia
Czech expatriate football managers